Thơm Portland, or simply Thơm, is a Vietnamese restaurant in Portland, Oregon.

Description
Thơm is a Vietnamese restaurant in northeast Portland's Concordia neighborhood, specializing in pho. Portland Monthly Karen Brooks has described the restaurant, which has a seating capacity of 10, as "tiny" and "casual". She wrote, "The feel is of stepping into a hidden studio in a mid-century home—blonde wood everywhere, painterly shades of green, a trio of hanging Isamu Noguchi Akari light sculptures, and customized wood speakers, four of them, strategically placed around the room." The menu has included Phở Bo (beef noodle), Phở Chay (vegan phở), Bún Thịt Nướng (barbecue pork noodles), and Cơm Gà (chicken and rice), vermicelli, and rice plates.

History
Brothers Jimmy and Johnny Le opened Thơm in August 2021, in a space which previously housed The Big Egg and Sugar Cube.

Reception
In 2021, Michael Russell of The Oregonian called Thơm the "second-wave Vietnamese restaurant Portland has been waiting for". He included Thơm in a list of Portland's best new restaurants and the bún thịt nướng in an overview of the year's "most memorable" dishes, writing: 

Karen Brooks included Thơm in Portland Monthly Best Restaurants list. Brooke Jackson-Glidden included the restaurant in Eater Portland's 2022 overview of "Where to Eat and Drink on Alberta".

See also

 List of Vietnamese restaurants

References

External links
 

2021 establishments in Oregon
Concordia, Portland, Oregon
Restaurants established in 2021
Vietnamese restaurants in Portland, Oregon